Meera Lebbe Ahamed Fareeth (18 April 1940 – 10 September 1985) was a Sri Lankan politician and Member of Parliament for Batticaloa.

References

1940 births
Members of the 8th Parliament of Sri Lanka
People from Eastern Province, Sri Lanka
United National Party politicians
1985 deaths